The epidemiology of depression has been studied across the world.
Depression is a major cause of morbidity worldwide, as the epidemiology has shown. Lifetime prevalence estimates vary widely, from 3% in Japan to 17% in India. Epidemiological data shows higher rates of depression in the Middle East, North Africa, South Asia and U.S.A than in other regions and countries. Among the 10 countries studied, the number of people who would experience depression during their lives falls within an 8–12% range in most of them.

In North America, the probability of having a major depressive episode within any year-long period is 3–5% for males and 8–10% for females.

Demographic dynamics 
Population studies have consistently shown major depression to be about twice as common in women as in men, although it is not yet clear why this is so. The relative increase in occurrence is related to pubertal development rather than chronological age, reaches adult ratios between the ages of 15 and 18, and appears associated with psychosocial more than hormonal factors.

People are most likely to suffer their first depressive episode between the ages of 30 and 40, and there is a second, smaller peak of incidence between ages 50 and 60. The risk of major depression is increased with neurological conditions such as stroke, Parkinson's disease, or multiple sclerosis and during the first year after childbirth. The risk of major depression has also been related to environmental stressors faced by population groups such as war combatants or physicians in training.

It is also more common after cardiovascular illnesses, and is related to a poor outcome of cardiovascular diseases. Studies conflict on the prevalence of depression in the elderly, but most data suggest there is a reduction in this age group. Depressive disorders are most common in urban than in rural population and, in general, the prevalence is higher in groups with adverse socio-economic factors (for example in homeless people).

Data on the relative prevalence of major depression among different ethnic groups have reached no clear consensus. However, the only known study to have covered dysthymia in the US specifically found it to be more common in African and Mexican Americans than in European Americans.

Projections indicate that depression may be the second leading cause of life lost after heart disease by 2020.

In 2016, a study, published by JAMA Psychiatry, and written by Charlotte Wessel Skovlund, found an association between hormonal contraception and depression.

By country and category 
Age-standardised disability-adjusted life year (DALY) rates per 10,000 inhabitants in 2017.

See also 
 Prevalence of mental disorders

References 

Major depressive disorder
Depression